Miss World 2015, the 65th edition of the Miss World pageant, was held on 19 December 2015 at the outdoor arena of the Crown of Beauty Theatre in Sanya, China. 114 contestants from all over the world competed for the crown. Rolene Strauss of South Africa crowned her successor Mireia Lalaguna of Spain at the end of the event. It was the first time in the history of Miss World that Spain won the pageant.

Since this year, the swimsuit competition (Miss World Beach Beauty) has been officially removed from the pageant.

Results

Placements

§ People's Choice Winner

Continental Queens of Beauty

Order of Announcements
Top 20

Top 11

Top 5

Challenge Events

Sports 

– source:

Top Model

World Designer Award 
The world designer event was also the first stage of the Miss World Top Model Challenge Event, which takes place on 12 December.

Talent 

– source:

Dances of the World 

– source:

Multimedia

Beauty with a Purpose

Contestants
114 delegates competed in Miss World 2015.

– 2015 contestants source:

Judges
The judges panel for Miss World 2015 were:
 Julia Morley – Chairman of the Miss World Organization
 Mike Dixon – Musical Director
 Ken Warwick – Hollywood producer and executive producer and director of Miss World
 Andrew Minarik – head of the team for Miss World Hair & Beauty
 Donna Walsh – professional dancer and director
 Linda Pétursdóttir – Miss World 1988 from Iceland
 Agbani Darego – Miss World 2001 from Nigeria
 Azra Akın – Miss World 2002 from Turkey
 Zhang Zilin – Miss World 2007 from China PR
 Ksenia Sukhinova – Miss World 2008 from Russia
 Liliana Tanoesoedibjo – CEO of Media Nusantara Citra, Owner and National Director of Miss Indonesia

Notes

Returns
Last competed in 2013:

Designations
  – Jasmin Jael Rhamdas was appointed "Miss World Belize 2015" after a casting call was organised by Michael Arnold, national director of Miss World Belize.
 – Angelica Reyes was appointed "Miss Costa Rica Mundo 2015" by Allan Aleman national director for Miss World in Costa Rica after a casting call was organised by Reinas de Costa Rica organisation franchise holder for Miss World in Costa Rica. 
  – Alexandra Krijger was appointed "Miss World Curaçao 2015" by Dushi-Magazine, franchise holders for Miss World in Curaçao after the pageant was not held due to lack of funding and sponsorships. Krijger was the 3rd runner-up at the Miss Curaçao World 2014 pageant. 
 – Marcela Santamaría was appointed to represent El Salvador by Liz De Castaneda, national director of Nuestra Belleza El Salvador after the national pageant was postponed until January 2016. Santamaría was crowned Reinado de El Salvador International 2011.
  – Lisa Punch was selected as Guyana's representative to Miss World 2015 by the national director of Miss World Guyana, Natasha Martaindale, after the Miss World Guyana 2015 pageant was cancelled due to lack of applicants and the upcoming General elections in Guyana. Punch was chosen from the few applicants who applied for the pageants 2015 edition before it was cancelled. She was a finalist at ABC's Rising Star show.
  – Jung Eun-ju was appointed "Miss World Korea 2015" by Park Jeong-ah, national director of Miss World Korea, after the pageant was postponed to late November this year. Jung was the 1st runner-up at the Miss World Korea 2014 pageant.
 – Emilija Rozman was appointed "Miss Makedonija 2015" by Lidija Velkovska, national director of Miss Macedonia pageant.
  – Fay Teresa Vålbekk was appointed "Miss World Norway 2015" at a casting call held by Morten Sommerfeldt, national director of Miss World Norway. Vålbekk was the 1st runner-up at the Frøken Norge 2011 pageant.
  – Giovanna Cordeiro was chosen "Miss Mundo Paraguay 2015" by Promociones Gloria, franchise holders for Miss World in Paraguay. Nuestra Belleza Paraguay was not held this year due to lack of time in organising the pageant hence the representatives to various international pageants were chosen in a closed door election from the contestants of Nuestra Belleza Paraguay 2014.Cordeiro was the 3rd runner-up at Nuestra Belleza Paraguay 2014.
  – Natalia Onet was appointed "Miss World Romania 2015" by Ernest Hadrian Böhm the president of Miss World Romania after a casting call was organised by ExclusivEvent agency franchise holders for Miss World in Romania. 
  – Jackiema Flemming was appointed "Miss World St. Kitts & Nevis 2015" by Eversley Liburd and Joan Millard, franchise holders for Miss World in St. Kitts & Nevis. Flemming was the 2nd runner-up at the St. Kitts & Nevis National Carnival Queen Pageant 2014–2015.
  – Latafale Auva'a, the reigning Miss Samoa and Miss Pacific Islands, was appointed to represent Samoa at Miss World 2015 by Ulalemamae Te'eva Matafai, national director of Miss World Samoa.
  – Jahne Issac was appointed "Miss US Paraside World 2015" after a casting call was held by Miss US Paraside organisation.

Replacements
  – Kristina Bakiu was appointed to represent Albania by Vera Grabocka, President of Miss & Mister Albania after she decided to replace Daniela Pajaziti for undisclosed reasons. Bakiu was crowned Miss Universe Albania 2013, but was unable to compete at Miss Universe 2013 due to age issues. 
  – Catharina Choi was crowned "Miss Mundo Brasil 2015", after Ana Luisa Castro the original winner voluntarily relinquished her title when it was discovered that she had been married to Belgian model and actor, Tanguy Backer before entering the pageant. Nunes was the 1st runner-up at the Miss Mundo Brasil 2015 pageant.
  – Veneta Kristeva was appointed "Miss World Bulgaria 2015" by the Miss Bulgaria organisation, as a replacement to Simona Evgenieva, Miss Bulgaria 2014, who will not be able to participate in Miss World because of a scheduling conflict with the Miss Bulgaria 2015 finals. Kristeva was crowned Miss Universe Bulgaria 2013. 
  – Hinarere Taputu was appointed "Miss World France 2015" by the national director of Miss France, Sylvie Tellier, as a replacement to Camille Cerf, Miss France 2015, who will not be able to participate in Miss World because of a scheduling conflict, as she crowns her successor on the same day as the Miss World 2015 finals. Taputu represented Tahiti at Miss France 2015 and was the 1st runner-up at the pageant.
  –  Margot Hanekamp was appointed to compete at Miss World 2015 by the Miss Nederland Organization when the winner of Miss Nederland 2015 pageant, Jessie Jazz chose to compete at Miss Universe 2015. This year the winner of Miss Nederland pageant was crowned to participate at both Miss Universe and Miss World contests but this is impossible due to the conflicting dates of the Miss Universe and Miss World pageants. Hanekamp was the 1st runner-up at the Miss Nederland 2015 pageant. 
  – Lilian Kamazima was crowned "Miss Tanzania 2014" as the original winner Sitti Mtemvu, resigned after she was accused for a scandal regarding her age. Kamazima was the 1st runner-up at the Miss Tanzania 2014 pageant.
  – Maroua Heni was selected "Miss Tunisie 2015", after Rawia Djebli the original winner was stripped of her title for failing to fulfill her obligations by Aida Antar, the President of Miss Tunisie Organisation. Heny was chosen at a separate private selection organised by Association TEJ franchise holders for Miss World in Tunisia. She represented Sidi Bouzid Governorate at Miss Tunisie 2015 and placed in the top 10 at the pageant.
  – Annie Mutambu was chosen "Miss Zimbabwe 2015", after Emily Kachote the previous winner of the pageant was stripped of her title when her nude pictures circulated on social media. Mutambu was the 1st runner-up at the Miss Zimbabwe 2015 pageant. For the second consecutive year, the pageant's winner has been stripped of her title for a similar scandal.

Withdrawals

 
 
 
 
 
  
 
 
 
  - the host country dosen't recognize Kosovo as an independent country.

Did not compete
  – Rym Amari, Miss Algerie 2013 was appointed to represent Algeria by Faisal Hamdad, the President of Miss Algerie Organisation however Amari withdrew from the Miss World competition just days before kick-off due to visa issues. Last year Fatma Zohra Chouaib, Miss Algerie 2014 could not compete at Miss World 2014 because of the same problem. Algeria would have returned to Miss World after its debut in 2002.
 –  Laila Da Costa was crowned Miss Guiné - Bissau 2014 to participate at Miss World 2014 however Da Costa couldn't compete due to visa issues. She was expected to compete at the 2015 edition but withdrew because of the same problem.

Could not compete
 – Anastasia Lin was willing and entitled to participate in the event as Miss World Canada, and the pageant still lists her as a contestant. However, up to the last minute, Lin waited for an official invitation that is necessary for Chinese visa application, but to no avail and hence missed the official deadline of 20 November 2015 for entry to the pageant and was declared persona non grata by the Chinese Government. Lin had openly criticised China's human rights violations. She was allowed by the Miss World Organization to compete at Miss World 2016.

General references

References

Further reading

External links
 

Miss World
2015 in China
World
Beauty pageants in China
December 2015 events in China
Sanya